"Are You Sincere" is a song written by Wayne Walker, originally released in 1957. Andy Williams recorded the song, which Cadence Records issued as a single in 1958, with an orchestra conducted by Archie Bleyer.  Since Williams' success, the song has been covered many times in pop and country styles. Notable covers include versions by: The Platters (1959), Eddy Arnold (1961), Gene McDaniels (1961), Marty Robbins (1961), Lenny Welch (1963), Trini Lopez (1965), Ray Anthony (1968), Bobby Vinton (1969), Brook Benton (1970), Jean Shepard (1973), Elvis Presley (1973), Mel Tillis (1979), Charley Pride (1986),

Chart performance
"Are You Sincere" reached number three on the Billboard Most Played by Disc Jockeys chart.

Elvis Presley recording
Elvis Presley recorded it on September 24, 1973, at his home in Palm Springs, California. It first appeared on the 1973 album Raised on Rock / For Ol' Times Sake, and then saw release as a single after his death, reaching number 10 on the U.S. country chart. It appeared on Disc 4 of Walk a Mile in My Shoes: The Essential '70s Masters.

References

1957 songs
1958 singles
1979 singles
Andy Williams songs
Elvis Presley songs
Cadence Records singles
Songs written by Wayne Walker (songwriter)